The following Confederate States Army units and commanders fought in the Battle of Cross Keys of the American Civil War. The Union order of battle is listed separately.

Abbreviations used

Military rank
 Gen = General
 LTG = Lieutenant General
 MG = Major General
 BG = Brigadier General
 Col = Colonel
 Ltc = Lieutenant Colonel
 Maj = Major
 Cpt = Captain
 Lt = Lieutenant
 Sgt = Sergeant

Other
 w = wounded
 mw = mortally wounded
 k = killed

Department of the Valley
MG Thomas J. Jackson

Forces at Cross Keys
MG Richard S. Ewell

*Jackson's Division crossed over to Port Republic after a brief fight with Shields' cavalry, in which only the units listed above engaged.

References
 June 8, 1862 - Battle of Cross Keys, Va. The War of the Rebellion: A Compilation of the Official Records of the Union and Confederate Armies. United States War Department.  Volume XII, Chapter XXIV, pp. 711–750.  (1885)

American Civil War orders of battle